Randiya Dahara (Golden Water) is a 2004 Sri Lankan Sinhala drama film directed by Udayakantha Warnasuriya and produced by Neil Ranjth Palliyaguruge for R.J Films. It stars Geetha Kumarasinghe and Kamal Addararachchi in lead roles along with Jackson Anthony and Mahendra Perera. Music composed by veteran musician Premasiri Khemadasa. It is the 1045th Sri Lankan film in the Sinhala cinema.

Shooting was completed from fifty days in the locations in and around Colombo, Divulapitiya and Diyatalawa.

Plot

Cast
 Geetha Kumarasinghe as Amali Weerasuriya
 Kamal Addararachchi as Captain Samantha Weerasuriya
 Jackson Anthony as Lionel
 Anula Karunathilaka as Samantha's Amma
 Mahendra Perera as Kulatunga
 Sanath Gunathilake as Colonel Chanuka Hettiarachchi
 Jeevan Kumaratunga as Lieutenant Colonel Viraj Thenuwara
 Henry Jayasena as Samantha's father
 Buddhika Jayaratne as Captain Cyril
 Udula Dabare as Amali's mother
 Seetha Kumari as Samantha's aunt
 Ranjith Rubasinghe as Lionel's henchman
 Milton Jayawardena as Major Saliya
 Gunawardena Hettiarachchi as Cyrus agency agent
 G.R Perera as Loan agent
 Palitha Galappaththi as Repossessed car driver
 Rathna Lalani Jayakody as Lionel's wife

Soundtrack

References

2004 films
2000s Sinhala-language films
Films directed by Udayakantha Warnasuriya